The 1991 Calgary Stampeders finished in 2nd place in the West Division with an 11–7 record. The Stampeders won their first playoff game(s) since 1979 and also appeared in the Grey Cup game for the first time in 20 years but they lost to the Toronto Argonauts.

Offseason

CFL Draft

Preseason

Regular season

Season Standings

Season schedule

Awards and records

1991 CFL All-Stars

Western All-Star Selections

Playoffs

West Semi-Final

West Final

Grey Cup

References

Calgary Stampeders seasons
N. J. Taylor Trophy championship seasons
Calg